The 2018–19 season was Milton Keynes Dons' 15th season in their existence, and the club's first season back in League Two following relegation from League One at the end of the 2017–18 season. Along with competing in League Two, the club also competed in the FA Cup, EFL Cup and EFL Trophy.

The season covers the period from 1 July 2018 to 30 June 2019.

Competitions

League Two

Final table

Source: Sky Sports

Matches

FA Cup

EFL Cup

EFL Trophy

Southern Group H Table

Matches

Squad
 Note: Players' ages as of the club's opening fixture of the 2018–19 season.

Transfers

Transfers in

Transfers out

Loans in

Loans out

Awards
EFL League Two Manager of the Month (October 2018): Paul Tisdale

References

External links

Official Supporters Association website
MK Dons news on MKWeb

Milton Keynes Dons
Milton Keynes Dons F.C. seasons